Tony Tebby is a computer programmer and the designer of Qdos, the computer operating system used in the Sinclair QL personal computer, while working as an engineer at Sinclair Research in the early 1980s. He left Sinclair Research in 1984 in protest at the premature launch of the QL, and formed QJUMP Ltd., a software house specializing in system software and utilities for the QL, based in Rampton, Cambridgeshire, England.

Prior to this he worked at the Philips Research Laboratories in Redhill, Surrey where he worked on realtime image processing, using electronic hardware rather than software. At that time, software would have been either a batch program on the PRL mainframe computer or, within the departmental laboratory, the Commodore PET.

Among the software developed by QJUMP was SuperToolkit II, a collection of extensions to Qdos and SuperBASIC; a Qdos floppy disk driver which became the de facto standard for the various third-party floppy disk interfaces sold for the QL; and the QJUMP Pointer Environment, which extended the primitive display windowing facility of Qdos into something approaching a full GUI. Tebby also received a commission to write a Qdos-like operating system for the Atari ST; this was called SMS2.

Tebby later moved to Le Grand-Pressigny, France, but continued his involvement in the QL user community. In the early 1990s, he developed SMSQ, a new Qdos-compatible OS, based on SMS2, for the Miracle Systems QXL, a QL emulator card for PCs. An enhanced version of SMSQ was ported to the Atari ST and various other QL emulators, being renamed SMSQ/E. He has also worked on Stella, an embedded operating system for 68000-series and ColdFire processors.

References 

Computer programmers
Sinclair Research
Living people
Year of birth missing (living people)